Mohammed Swaleh Naqvi (1933 – 7 September 2019) was a British Pakistani banker and convicted felon who was the chief executive officer of Bank of Credit and Commerce International. He was convicted in the BCCI banking fraud and served jail time for eight years.

Career
Naqvi was made chief executive officer of the Bank of Credit and Commerce International in 1988. In October 1994, he was jailed for eight years in the BCCI banking fraud and was fined $255.4 million by a U.S. federal court.

Death
Naqvi died on 7 September 2019, in Karachi after a brief illness.

References

1933 births
2019 deaths
Bank of Credit and Commerce International people
Pakistani bankers
Pakistani chief executives
Pakistani emigrants to the United Kingdom
Pakistani fraudsters
Pakistani people imprisoned abroad
Pakistani white-collar criminals
Prisoners and detainees of the United Kingdom